Puerto Carrillo is a district of the Hojancha canton, in the Guanacaste province of Costa Rica.

History 
Puerto Carrillo was created on 23 July 1999 by Decreto Ejecutivo 28027-G. Segregated from Hojancha.

Geography 
Puerto Carrillo has an area of  km² and an elevation of  metres.

Situated along the Pacific Coast of Costa Rica's Guanacaste Province, Puerto Carrilo is a jewel among Costa Rica's Pacific beaches. The town itself is very small (less than 500 full-time residents) and is predominantly a sport-fishing village with a handful of nice hotels, restaurants, two small food markets, and tour operators. While there are only a limited number of hotels and places to eat in Carrillo, many options are available in the nearby town of Samara, just 4 km away. The population in Carrillo is mainly local residents and still maintains an authentically Costa Rican atmosphere. The district has a population of around 1,800 people.

Economy

Tourism
Puerto Carrillo is a small unobtrusive community that has been playing host to some of the most renowned sport fishing boats in the world, since its discovery as a billfish destination over 15 years ago. The tiny harbor affords protection to a small handful of charter and private boats that are here on permanent bases. The beautiful white sand beach has small waves most of the time, and is popular with swimmers and families with kids. Playa Carrillo is never crowded, and it offers nice picnic areas right on the beach. Your car will be within easy reach, wherever you decide to spend your day in the sand.

Carrillo also offers beautiful and secluded small beaches nearby. El Roble is a rocky beach with its own waterfall and tide pools. Playa El Sur a beautiful medium size beach surrounded by palm trees (only accessible by boat). Playa Samara, 4 km to the north, is a much larger beach with waves generally near knee to waist high, and is a popular place for beginning surfers and families.

Demographics 

For the 2011 census, Puerto Carrillo had a population of  inhabitants.

Transportation

Road transportation 
The district is covered by the following road routes:
 National Route 158
 National Route 160
 National Route 901

Access to Carrillo is via paved roads. The paving of the "Road 150" from Nicoya through Sámara to Carrillo was completed in early 2006, which greatly increased the accessibility of the region and dramatically reduced driving times. The total drive now takes about 4 hours from San Jose's Juan Santamaría International Airport (SJO) and under 2 hours from Liberia's Daniel Oduber International Airport (LIR). Public buses operate between nearby Sámara and Nicoya several times a day; express buses operated by Empresa Alfaro also connect Sámara with San José usually twice a day (except weekends).

Air service was provided by Sansa Airlines to the adjacent Carrillo Airport. The airport is no longer in use.

Villages
Administrative center of the district is the village of Puerto Carrillo.

Other villages in the district are Angostura, Arbolito, Cuesta Malanoche, Estrada Rábago, Jobo, Lajas, Quebrada Bonita (partly), San Miguel and Santa María.

Gallery

References

External links
 Travel guide to the Nicoya Peninsula, Costa Rica

Districts of Guanacaste Province
Populated places in Guanacaste Province